The Kentucky Folk Art Center is a folk art museum administered by Morehead State University in Morehead, Kentucky, United States. Its focus is not only to preserve and educate the public on visual folk art but also to promote traditional Appalachian traditional music, storytelling, literature, dance, and crafts.

About

The Kentucky Folk Art Center was established in 1985 as part of Morehead State University's Folk Art Collection. The collection was housed on two separate buildings on campus until 1997 when the collection was moved to the historic Union Grocery Building in Morehead's First Street Arts District. It holds 1,407 works by Kentucky folk artists. 

The main floor of the historic building includes the Lovena and William Richardson Gallery, a rotating installation of 115 objects from KFAC's 1400-piece collection of folk art; the museum store, a retail outlet for folk art and educational materials; and the 50-seat Jimmie Ruth Auditorium for group activities. The second floor houses the Garland and Minnie Adkins Gallery, a showcase for a variety of cultural events; the Edgar Tolson Folk Art Library; a conference room and staff offices; and modern archival and storage space for the permanent collection.

In 2009, the museum was awarded the Kentucky Folk Heritage Award.

In recent years the Center has suffered from large budget cuts from both the State and Morehead University.

Featured artists  

 Minnie Adkins
 Linvel Barker
 Ronald & Jessie Cooper
 Marvin Finn
 Charley Kinney
 Noah Kinney
 Jo Neace Krause
 Helen LaFrance
 Tim Lewis
 Carl McKenzie
 Robert Morgan
 Mark Anthony Mulligan
 Earnest Patton
 Nan Phelps
 Hugo Sperger
 Donny Tolson
 Edgar Tolson
 LaVon Van Williams

References

External links
 
 Morehead State University

Museums in Rowan County, Kentucky
Southern art
Kentucky culture
Folk art museums and galleries in Kentucky
Contemporary crafts museums in the United States
Art museums established in 1985
Morehead State University
University museums in Kentucky
1985 establishments in Kentucky